Cacapon is a term of Native American origin that means "medicine waters." It may refer to:

Buildings and structures 
Capon Chapel, a 1750s church in Hampshire County, West Virginia
Fort Capon, a 1756 stockade fort near Forks of Cacapon, Hampshire County, West Virginia

Geophysical features 
Cacapon Mountain, a mountain in Morgan and Hampshire counties of West Virginia
Little Cacapon Mountain, a mountain ridge in Hampshire County, West Virginia
Cacapon River, a river in the Appalachian Mountains of West Virginia
Little Cacapon River, a river in Hampshire County, West Virginia

Parks and recreational places 
Cacapon Resort State Park, a state park in Morgan County, West Virginia
Capon Springs Resort, a resort and spa in Capon Springs, West Virginia

Populated places 
Capon Bridge, West Virginia
Capon Lake, West Virginia
Capon Springs, West Virginia

See also